Jerome M. Fernandez was the first Indian bishop of the Roman Catholic Diocese of Quilon, India. He is the founder of the Missionary Sisters of St.Therese of Infant Jesus (MSST). He was declared Servant of God on February 24, 2019 by Kollam Bishop Paul Antony Mullassery at Infant Jesus Cathedral, Thangassery.

Early life 
Jerome M. Fernandez was born on 8 September 1901 in Koivila, Kollam, Kerala. He studied from St. Aloysius School, St. Raphael's Minor Seminary and St. Teresa's Major Seminary.

Priesthood 
On 24 March 1928, Fernandez was ordained a catholic priest for the Roman Catholic diocese of Quilon.

Episcopate 
Fernandez was appointed bishop of the Roman catholic diocese of Quilon on 25 September 1937 by Pope John XXII and consecrated on 12 December 1937 by Archbishop Joseph Attipetty. He took retirement from pastoral services on 30 January 1978. He was succeeded by Rt. Rev. Dr. Joseph Gabriel Fernandez.

Death 
Fernandez died on 26 February 1992 in Kerala, India.

Sainthood 
The proceedings for the canonization was started on  24 February 2019 in Kerala and Bishop Jerome.M.Fernandez was declared Servant of God.

Legacy 
Bishop Jerome Institute has been set up in Kerala, India in his memory.

References 

Indian Servants of God
20th-century Roman Catholic bishops in India
1901 births
1992 deaths
Indian Roman Catholic bishops
Founders of Catholic religious communities